Jack Wild (30 September 1952 – 1 March 2006) was an English actor and singer. He is best known for his role as the Artful Dodger in the film Oliver! (1968), for which he received an Academy Award nomination for Best Supporting Actor at the age of 16, becoming the fourth-youngest nominee in the category. He also received BAFTA Award and Golden Globe Award nominations for the role.

Wild also appeared in the television series H.R. Pufnstuf (1969) and its film adaptation Pufnstuf (1970), as well as in the films Melody (1971) and Robin Hood: Prince of Thieves (1991).

Early life and education
Wild was born into a working-class family in Royton, Lancashire, on 30 September 1952. In 1960, at the age of eight, with his parents and his elder brother Arthur, he moved to Hounslow, in Middlesex, where he got a job helping the milkman, which paid about five shillings. While playing football with his brother in the park, he was discovered by theatrical agent June Collins, mother of Phil Collins. June Collins enrolled both Jack and Arthur at the Barbara Speake Stage School, an independent school in Acton, west London.

Acting career

Oliver!

The Wild brothers sought acting roles to supplement their parents' income. In the autumn of 1964, the pair were cast in the West End theatre production of Lionel Bart's Oliver! – Arthur in the title role and Jack as Charley Bates, a member of Fagin's gang. Wild was chosen to play the Artful Dodger for the 1968 movie version of Oliver! His performance received critical acclaim and several nominations:

Academy Award for Best Supporting Actor – nominated at the 41st Academy Awards
Golden Globe Award for Most Promising Newcomer – nominated at 26th Golden Globe Awards
BAFTA Award for Most Promising Newcomer – nominated at 22nd British Academy Film Awards

TV work

In the spring of 1966, Wild left the stage show of Oliver! to make the film serial Danny the Dragon for the Children's Film Foundation. Wild's first speaking roles on TV were in an episode of Out of the Unknown, and in the third part of the BBC's version of the Wesker trilogy, I'm Talking About Jerusalem. He also appeared in episodes of Z-Cars, The Newcomers, and George and the Dragon.

After Oliver!
At the 1968 premiere of Oliver!, Wild met brothers Sid and Marty Krofft, who thought he would make a good lead for a show they were developing called H.R. Pufnstuf. Wild starred as Jimmy in Pufnstuf's only season (1969), as well as in H.R. Pufnstuf segments in the second (and final) season of The Banana Splits Adventure Hour and in the film Pufnstuf (1970), which was released shortly after the show was cancelled. 

Wild then appeared in Melody (1971, with Oliver! co-star Mark Lester) and Flight of the Doves (1971, with another Oliver! co-star, Ron Moody). In 1972, Wild appeared as a stowaway in an episode of BBC TV's The Onedin Line. In 1973, he played Reg in The 14, a film directed by David Hemmings. On television, Wild appeared in a BBC adaptation of Our Mutual Friend in 1976.  During the early 1970s, Wild was considered a teen heartthrob, alongside David Cassidy and Barry Williams.  In 1999, Wild lamented, "When I first entered in the show business, of course I didn't mind playing younger roles. However, it did bug me when I would be 21 being offered the role of a 13-year-old. I'm not saying I didn't enjoy playing these roles; I had barrels of fun, I just wanted more serious and dramatic roles; it's that simple." 

He also embarked on a recording career, releasing The Jack Wild Album for Capitol Records, which contained the single "Some Beautiful". In the early 1970s, Wild also released the albums Everything's Coming Up Roses and Beautiful World for Buddah Records.

Later career
Wild returned to the big screen in a few minor roles, such as in the 1991 Kevin Costner film Robin Hood: Prince of Thieves and as a peddler in Basil (1998). For the most part, he spent the remainder of his career working in theatre. Wild's last major appearance was as the male lead, Mouse, in Tayla Goodman's rock musical Virus. The show ran for two weeks at the Theatre Royal, Nottingham, in 1999. For his final film appearance, he had a minor role in Moussaka & Chips (2005), in which he once again worked with Ron Moody.

Personal life
Wild first met Welsh-born actress Gaynor Jones when they were around 12 years old at the Barbara Speake stage school. After he left in 1966, he did not see her again until Christmas 1970. They married on 14 February 1976. She left him in 1985 because of his chronic drinking. He met his second wife, Claire L. Harding, when he was working with her in Jack and the Beanstalk in Worthing. They married in Bedford in September 2005. In 2001, Wild was diagnosed with oral cancer, blaming the disease on his drinking and smoking habits. He underwent chemotherapy immediately, and had his tongue and voice box removed in July 2004, leaving him unable to speak. Wild had to communicate through his wife Claire for the rest of his life.

Alcoholism
By 21, Wild was an alcoholic. After exhausting his remaining fortune, he lived with his retired father for a few years. His alcoholism caused three cardiac arrests and resulted in numerous hospital stays. He was diagnosed with diabetes on 14 March 1983. His alcoholism ruined both his career and marriage to Gaynor Jones, who left him in 1985 because of his drinking. 

During the mid-1980s, he often drank three to four bottles of vodka a week, and typically drank half a bottle of vodka and two bottles of wine every day. He later admitted his alcoholism was so debilitating that he was incapable of performing any kind of work. He once attended a drying-out clinic for drug addicts and alcoholics, run by Pete Townshend, but after being "dry" for six weeks, he bought a bottle of champagne to celebrate the fact he had stopped drinking. Wild eventually became sober on 6 March 1989, after joining a support group, Alcoholics Victorious.

Death and legacy
Wild died on 1 March 2006 of oral cancer. He is buried in Toddington Parish Cemetery, Bedfordshire. He had been unable to speak for the last two years of his life following the operation in which his vocal cords and part of his tongue were removed.

At the time of his death, he and his wife Claire had been working on his autobiography. She said: "All the material was there when Jack died, it just needed rearranging, editing, and in certain sections, writing out from transcripts Jack and I made as we recorded him talking about his life." The book, It's a Dodger's Life , was published in 2016 with a foreword by Pufnstuf co-star Billie Hayes, an afterword by Clive Francis, and an epilogue by Wild's wife.

Filmography

Discography

Albums

 The Jack Wild Album (1970)
A1	"Sugar and Spice"	
A2	"Early in the Morning"	
A3	"Fish And Chips"	
A4	"Some Beautiful"	
A5	"A Picture of You"	
B1	"Wait For Summer"	
B2	"Maxwell's Silver Hammer"	
B3	"Melody"	
B4	"When I'm Sixty-Four"	
B5	"Lazy Sunday"
 Everything's Coming Up Roses (1971) 
A1	"(Holy Moses!) Everything's Coming Up Roses"	
A2	"The Pushbike Song"	
A3	"Cotton Candy"	
A4	"Bring Yourself Back To Me"
A5	"Hello (Jack)"
B1	"The Old Man Song (Na Na Na Na)"	
B2	"Apeman"
B3	"Takin' It Easy"
B4	"Ob-La-Di, Ob-La-Da"
B5	"What Have They Done to My Song Ma"
 A Beautiful World (1972)
A1	"A Beautiful World"	
A2	"Punch and Judy"	
A3	"Sweet Sweet Lovin'"	
A4	"Bird in the Hand"	
A5	"The Lord"
B1	"Beggar Boy"
B2	"Songs of Freedom"	
B3	"Being With You"	
B4	"E.O.I.O."
B5	"Bunny Bunny"

Singles

See also
 List of British actors
List of oldest and youngest Academy Award winners and nominees – Youngest nominees for Best Actor in a Supporting Role
List of British Academy Award nominees and winners
List of actors with Academy Award nominations

References

Bibliography
 Wild, Jack. Autobiography: It's A Dodger's Life, Fantom Films 2016. Hardback edition  
 Holmstrom, John. The Moving Picture Boy: An International Encyclopaedia from 1895 to 1995, Norwich, Michael Russell, 1996, p. 296. 
 Dye, David. Child and Youth Actors: Filmography of Their Entire Careers, 1914-1985. Jefferson, NC: McFarland & Co., 1988, p. 239.

External links

 Jack Wild Official Website
 Jack Wild at the British Film Institute
 
 
 

1952 births
2006 deaths
Deaths from cancer in England
Deaths from oral cancer
English male child actors
English male film actors
English male television actors
People from Royton
Male actors from Manchester
20th-century English male actors
People educated at Barbara Speake Stage School